The Galway-Kilkenny rivalry is a hurling rivalry between Irish county teams Galway and Kilkenny, who first played each other in 1898. Recently it has become one of the biggest rivalries in Gaelic games. Kilkenny's home ground is Nowlan Park and Galway's home ground is Pearse Stadium, however, all of their championship meetings have been held at neutral venues.

While Kilkenny have the highest number of All-Ireland and Leinster titles, Galway were the standard bearers in Connacht before joining the Leinster championship in 2009, however, All-Ireland success for them has been sporadic. Between them the two teams have won 41 All-Ireland championships.

History

While Kilkenny is classed as one of the "Big Three", Galway is considered an in-between county, meaning it has some good years and some bad years. Galway have always had the capability to stop the Kilkenny forces.

Statistics

Notable Matches

Galway 5-18 : 4-18 Kilkenny (August 2005 Croke Park) - Lauded as the greatest game of the modern era, Galway went in as underdogs but managed to stun the hurling world by enialating Kilkenny in the opening 30 minutes leading 2-11:1-04 after 30 minutes. Kilkenny came back into it and trailed only by 2 points at the break 2-11:3-05. But 3 second-half goals by Niall Healy helped Galway to stay in front and bring them to a shocking win by 5-18:4-18.	
Kilkenny 1-19 : 1-12 Galway (July 2010 at Croke Park) - Galways first Leinster final pitted them against the mighty Kilkenny who were going for an infamous 5-In-A-Row All Irelands. Despite a strong start with Galway jumping to a 1-03:0-00 lead, Kilkenny soon got to grips and rallied to lead 0-14:1-05 at half time. Galway were unlucky not to win the second half (K 1-05:0-07 G), but never gave up and battled until the end.	
Galway 2-21 : 2-11 Kilkenny (July 2012 at Croke Park) - Kilkenny had become the Kings of hurling and were seen as unbeatable, that is until Anthony Cunninghams men took them on in the Leinster Final of 2012. Galway held Kilkeeny scoreless for 20 minutes and led at half time by 2-12:0-04. Kilkenny fought back in the second half, but it was never going to be enough as Galway finished strongly to win their first Leinster title by 2-21:2-11.	
Kilkenny 0-19 : 2-13 Galway (September 2012 at Croke Park) - The sides second meeting in the 2012 Trilogy was the All-Ireland final. Again Galway jumped into a lead 1-04:0-02 and held on to lead by 5 at the break 1-09:0-07, but sloppy defending meant they conceded 10 second half frees all converted by Henry Shefflin. Galway finished with a last-gasp free from Joe Canning to force a replay, final score Galway 2-13, Kilkenny 0-19.	
Kilkenny 3-22: 3-11 Galway (September 2012 #2 at Croke Park) - For the third match in 2012 Galway jumped into a 2-02:0-02 lead but that was the last we heard of Galway until the dying moments as Kilkenny dominated the rest of the match scoring 3-22 to win by eleven points.	
Galway 5-16 : 3-22 Kilkenny  (June 2014 at O'Connor Park) - Galway came back from 10 points down with six minutes to play to force a draw. Joe Canning scored the last point of the game with the last play from out on the left near the touch-line to level the game after Henry Shefflin appeared to have won it for Kilkenny with a similar point at the other end. Kilkenny went on to win the replay the week after.

Recent results

Legend

Senior championship

National League

Records

Scorelines

 Biggest championship win:
 For Galway: 
Galway 5-4 - 2-0 Kilkenny, All-Ireland semi-final, Croke Park, 18 May 1924
Galway 9-4 - 6-0 Kilkenny, All-Ireland semi-final, Croke Park, 9 August 1925
 For Kilkenny: Kilkenny 5-28 - 3-7 Galway, All-Ireland semi-final, Croke Park, 6 August 1972
 Highest aggregate:
 Kilkenny 2-32 - 3-17 Galway, All-Ireland semi-final, St. Brendan's Park, 4 August 1974

Top scorers

Top scorer in a single game:
For Kilkenny:
 2-11 - Henry Shefflin, Kilkenny 4-20 - 1-10 Galway, All-Ireland qualifier, Semple Stadium, 11 July 2004
 0-17 - Eddie Keher, Kilkenny 5-28 - 3-7 Galway, All-Ireland semi-final, Croke Park, 6 August 1972
For Galway:
 2-9 - Ger Farragher, Galway 5-18 - 4-18 Kilkenny, All-Ireland semi-final, Croke Park, 21 August 2005
 2-9 - Joe Canning, Galway 3-13 - 2-20 Kilkenny, All-Ireland semi-final, O'Connor Park, 20 June 2009

External links
 Kilkenny v Galway head-to-head championship record

References

Kilkenny
Kilkenny county hurling team rivalries